Li Yilong (born June 1956) is a former Chinese politician who spent his entire career in  central China's Hunan province. He was investigated by the Communist Party of China's anti-graft agency in April 2016. Previously he served as the deputy director of Hunan Provincial Rural Work Leading Group.

Li Yilong is nicknamed "Mayor of Constructing Cities" for vigorously develop urban construction during his term in office.

Career
Born in Wangcheng County of Changsha, Hunan in June 1956, Li Yilong graduated from Zhongnan University of Economics and Law in 1988. He was a sent-down youth during the Down to the Countryside Movement.

He served in various posts in Changsha People's Government before serving as Communist Party Secretary of Liuyang, a county-level city under the jurisdiction of Changsha, in 2002. He was mayor of Huaihua from January 2007 to June 2008, and Communist Party Secretary, the top political position in the city, from March 2008 to March 2013. Then he was transferred to Hengyang and appointed the Communist Party Secretary there. In March 2016, he was named deputy director of Hunan Provincial Rural Work Leading Group, but having held the position for only one month, while he was placed under investigation by the Communist Party's anti-corruption agency.

Downfall
On September 23, 2016, he was detained by the Hunan Provincial People's Procuratorate. On November 23, he was expelled from the Communist Party of China (CPC) and dismissed from public office.

On August 11, 2017, he was indicted on suspicion of accepting bribes, corruption, abusing his powers, and holding a huge amount of property with unidentified sources.

On January 15, 2018, he was sentenced to 18 years for accepting bribes, holding a huge amount of property from an unidentified source and abusing his power by the Loudi Intermediate People's Court. His wife Yang Lan was sentenced to 3 years for accepting bribes.

Personal life
Li married Yang Lan (born 12 April 1968), who served as a section member in Changsha Municipal Government before detaining by the Central Commission for Discipline Inspection (CCDI).

References

External links

1956 births
Living people
People's Republic of China politicians from Hunan
Chinese Communist Party politicians from Hunan
Politicians from Changsha